The 1982 National Invitation Tournament was the 1982 edition of the annual NCAA college basketball competition.

Selected teams
Below is a list of the 32 teams selected for the tournament.

 American
 Bradley
 BYU
 Clemson
 Connecticut
 Dayton
 Fordham
 Georgia
 Illinois
 Iona
 Lamar
 Long Island
 LSU
 Maryland
 Mississippi
 Murray State
 Oklahoma
 Oral Roberts
 Purdue
 Richmond
 Rutgers
 Saint Peter's
 San Diego State
 Syracuse
 Temple
 Texas A&M
 Tulane
 UC Irvine
 UNLV
 Virginia Tech
 Washington
 Western Kentucky

Bracket
Below are the four first round brackets, along with the four-team championship bracket.

Semifinals & finals

See also
 1982 National Women's Invitational Tournament
 1982 NCAA Division I men's basketball tournament
 1982 NCAA Division II men's basketball tournament
 1982 NCAA Division III men's basketball tournament
 1982 NCAA Division I women's basketball tournament
 1982 NCAA Division II women's basketball tournament
 1982 NCAA Division III women's basketball tournament
 1982 NAIA Division I men's basketball tournament
 1982 NAIA Division I women's basketball tournament

References

National Invitation
National Invitation Tournament
1980s in Manhattan
Basketball competitions in New York City
College sports in New York City
Madison Square Garden
National Invitation Tournament
National Invitation Tournament
Sports in Manhattan